Township High School District 211 is a school district located in Cook County, Illinois, and is the largest high school district in Illinois. District 211 serves the communities of Hoffman Estates, Inverness, Palatine, and Schaumburg, and portions of Arlington Heights, Elk Grove, Hanover Park, Roselle,  Rolling Meadows, Streamwood, and South Barrington in the northwest suburbs of Chicago.

Schools

High schools

Special education schools

 District 211 North Campus
 Higgins Education Center

Academics
Each school is accredited by the North Central Association and has earned full recognition status by the Illinois Superintendent of Public Instruction. All five high schools have received the United States Department of Education’s Blue Ribbon School of Excellence Award, while Palatine and Fremd High Schools have each been recognized twice.

Palatine High School was one of only 10 schools nationally to be named a “New American High School” by the U.S. Department of Education in 2000. Three schools – Palatine, William Fremd, and Schaumburg High Schools – were named among the “Top 99” high schools in the country by U.S. News & World Report.

D211 carries a curriculum of more than 390 courses, a six-week summer school, and Advanced Placement opportunities in 34 subjects. The District also offers 66 dual credit courses with local colleges, including Harper College, Triton College, and
College of DuPage, as well as with the University of Illinois.

History

High School District 211 was named among the elite school districts in Illinois by Expansion Management magazine, a publication for corporate re-location, in 1999, 2001, 2003, 2005, and again in 2007.

On November 2, 2015, The New York Times reported that the federal government determined that District 211 violated anti-discrimination laws because "it did not allow a transgender student who identifies as a girl and participates on a girls’ sports team to change and shower in the girls’ locker room without restrictions." The New York Times added that the student in question "identifies as female but was born male."

Board of Education 

Township High School District 211 is governed by a seven-member Board of Education. Board members are elected to four year terms in non-partisan, at-large elections with three seats up for election in odd years after presidential election years (most recently in 2021) and four seats up for election in odd years after midterm election years (most recently in 2019). As of June 2021, the membership of the Board of Education is:
 Anna Klimkowicz (board president)
 Steven Rosenblum (board vice president)
 Kimberly Cavill (board secretary)
 Curtis Bradley
 Mark Cramer
 Peter Dombrowski
 Timothy Mc Gowan

2021 election 
In the April 6, 2021 race, the seats of board members Robert LeFevre, Ed Yung, and Anna Klimkowicz were up for election. Nine candidates ran for the three seats; Klimkowicz ran for reelection, while LeFevre and Yung did not. Curtis Bradley, Klimkowicz, and Timothy Mc Gowan—the winners of the election—ran as a slate. Jessica Hinkle, Kristen Steel, Robi Vollkommer, and Denise Wilson—the next highest vote-getters—were all supported by board member Mark Cramer. The four generally emphasized the importance of in-person learning over remote learning during the Covid-19 pandemic and the need for fiscal discipline within the district. Roxanne Wittkamp received the least votes; she was the only candidate not to coordinate with another. Amy Nelson announced on March 18, 2021 that she was suspending her campaign due to an employment conflict; although she was out of the race, she announced that it was too late to have her name removed from the ballot. Despite imploring supporters to not vote for her, she received 3,453 votes. 

Following the 2020 protests over the murder of George Floyd and the district's subsequent establishment of an equity team, equity concerns played a notable role in the race. In particular, Bradley and Mc Gowan, who are both black, made social justice a central issue of their campaigns. Their ultimate election to the board was described by The Daily Herald as a success for equity voices in the district and was featured in The Herald's analysis of the impact of George Floyd's murder on the Chicago suburbs. Bradley told The Herald that he thought the voters' acknowledgement of equity issues within the district was partially responsible for his election; Mc Gowan said that he saw his ascendance to the board as a direct response to the previous summer's protests. 

Prior to his run for the board, Mc Gowan was an activist who led Palatine's first Black Lives Matter demonstration in June 2020 and openly supported equitable changes to professional development, employment, and curriculum within the district. After Palatine High School teacher Jeanne Hedgepeth made a Facebook post that was critical of the Black Lives Matter movement and compared the term "white privilege" to a racial slur, Mc Gowan described the post as "unacceptable" coming from a teacher and called for her termination. Hedgepeth was placed under investigation for her remarks and was later terminated. Three weeks before the election, Hedgepeth sued Mc Gowan for defamation, alleging that he had made false statements about her on Facebook that had led to her firing. Mc Gowan's attorney disputed Hedgepeth's allegation, suggesting that the lawsuit's proximity to the election might be for political purposes. 

After the election, on April 29, 2021, the board selected its officers: Klimkowicz was selected as president, Steven Rosenblum was selected as vice president, and Kimberly Cavill was selected as secretary.

2019 election

2017 election

2015 election

2013 election

2011 election

2009 election

2007 election

2005 election

2003 election

2001 election

Feeder school districts
 Schaumburg Community Consolidated School District 54
 Palatine Community Consolidated School District 15

Notes

References

External links
 

School districts in Cook County, Illinois
Palatine, Illinois
Arlington Heights, Illinois
Hoffman Estates, Illinois
Schaumburg, Illinois
School districts established in 1914
1914 establishments in Illinois